Thibeau Stockbroekx (born 20 July 2000) is a field hockey player from Belgium, who plays as a forward.

Personal life
Thibeau Stockbroekx is the cousin of Emmanuel Stockbroekx, who also plays in the Belgian national team. He also has an older brother, Gregory, who represented Belgium in junior competition.

Career

Club hockey
In the Dutch Hoofdklasse, Stockbroekx is a member of the HC Oranje-Rood first team.

National teams
Stockbroekx has represented Belgium at both junior and senior levels.

Under–21
In 2019 Stockbroekx made his debut for the Belgium U–21 team during an eight–nations tournament in Madrid, winning a bronze medal. Later that year he went on to represent the team again at the EuroHockey Junior Championship in Valencia where the team finished 5th.

Stockbroekx was a member of the junior team at the 2021 Men's FIH Junior World Cup in Bhubaneswar.

Red Lions
Prior to making his junior debut, Stockbroekx earned his first senior cap in a 2019 test match against Russia. He went on to appear in the team once more that year.

In 2020 he represented the team again during season two of the FIH Pro League. He followed this up in 2021 with his first inclusion in the Red Lions squad.

References

External links
 
 

2000 births
Living people
Male field hockey forwards
Belgian male field hockey players
HC Oranje-Rood players
Men's Hoofdklasse Hockey players
Men's Belgian Hockey League players